Baron Salomon Maurits von Rajalin (25 August 1757 – 23 September 1825) was a Swedish Navy admiral and civil servant.

Career
Rajalin was born on 25 August 1757 in Karlskrona, Sweden, the son of the governor of Blekinge County Johan von Rajalin (who was titled Baron (friherre) from 1771) and his wife Barbara Eleonora von Gertten.

Appointed at the age of sixteen to acting sub-lieutenant in the Fleet of the Army, Rajalin served 1780–82 as an employee of the French Navy. After having returned to Sweden, he quickly rose through the ranks and became, since the Caribbean island of Saint Barthélemy in 1784 came into Swedish possession, in 1785 the first Swedish governor there. From there he was transferred in 1787 to the governor location on Gotland and held that post for 20 years, during which he however long periods of time held different positions of trust. He was during the Russo-Swedish War 1788–90 military commander of the Archipelago fleet and excelled particularly in an engagement at Porkkalanniemi on 26 August 1789.

After the peace treaty he became rear admiral in 1791 and was 1791–94 general commissary in the fleet. Appointed vice admiral in 1799, Rajalin was 1801–09 as acting adjutant general, rapporteur before the king in cases involving the fleet. During the Finnish War in 1808 he commanded the Archipelago fleet, but resigned from this position in October of that year. Appointed in 1809 by Charles XIII to admiral, he became in 1812 governor of Gävleborg County, but resigned already in 1813 from this position.

Personal life and death
On 10 November 1787 in Karlskrona, he married Fredrica Lovisa Jägersköld, the daughter of vice admiral Christer Ludvig Jägersköld and his wife Anna Fredrica Grubbe. von Rajalin died childless on 23 September 1825 in Stockholm. The funeral was held at Ulrika Eleonora Church and he was buried at Klara Cemetery. When his brother died in 1826, the baronial family von Rajalin was emanated.

Dates of rank
von Rajalins' ranks:

Sweden
14 September 1771 – Sergeant 
15 July 1773 – Second lieutenant
19 February 1777 – Lieutenant
4 June 1783 – Captain
22 September 1784 – Major
14 July 1787 – Lieutenant colonel
31 August 1787 – Major general
23 August 1790 – Rear admiral
5 August 1799 – Vice admiral
27 September 1808 – Admiral

France
1779 – Lieutenant des vaisseaux

Awards and decorations
   Commander Grand Cross of the Order of the Sword (1801)
   Commander of the Order of the Sword (1797)
   Knight Grand Cross of the Order of the Sword (1789)
   Knight of the Order of the Sword (1779)
   Knight of the Pour le Mérite Militaire

Honours
Honorary member of the Royal Swedish Academy of War Sciences (1805; president 1805–1806)
Honorary member of the Royal Swedish Society of Naval Sciences (1805)

References

External links

Article at Svenskt biografiskt lexikon 

1757 births
1825 deaths
Swedish Navy admirals
18th-century Swedish military personnel
19th-century Swedish military personnel
People of the Russo-Swedish War (1788–1790)
Swedish military personnel of the Finnish War
People from Karlskrona
Governors of Gotland
Commanders Grand Cross of the Order of the Sword
Swedish colonial governors of Saint Barthélémy